Siege of Narva may refer to:
 Siege of Narva (1558)
 Siege of Narva (1704)